Freddie as F.R.O.7 (also known as Freddie the Frog) is a 1992 British animated musical action fantasy comedy film written and directed by Jon Acevski and starring the voice of Ben Kingsley. Inspired by bedtime stories Acevski told to his son about his favourite toy frog working as a secret agent, it is a parody of James Bond.

The film was released in both the United Kingdom and the United States in the summer of 1992. It was negatively received by critics and audiences. It held the record of the lowest-grossing animated film at the US box office until The Ten Commandments in 2007, also starring Ben Kingsley.

Plot 
In the Middle Ages, 10-year-old Prince Frederic is orphaned when his evil aunt Messina kills his parents in hopes of taking the throne for herself. Rather than killing the young prince, Messina transforms him into a frog. He escapes and spends the rest of his childhood in his new life as Freddie the Frog. The story flashes forward to the 20th Century, where the seemingly immortal Freddie has grown up to become a member of the French secret service, with the code name F.R.O.7. He is called to London, England by the British Secret Service, where a villain known as El Supremo has been stealing the U.K.'s most famous buildings. By the time Freddie arrives, Nelson's Column, the Tower of London, Buckingham Palace, St. Pauls Cathedral, and Stonehenge are already missing. Assisting El Supremo is Freddie's still-living Aunt Messina.

Freddie meets his team: the Brigadier G; martial arts expert Daphne Fortescue a.k.a. Daffers; weapons expert Scotty; and Trilby. He learns that El Supremo is planning to steal Big Ben next. Freddie, Daffers, and Scotty go to a secret island in Scotland and discover that El Supremo plans to use the shrunken buildings as batteries to power a giant crystal, which will send a powerful sleeping virus across the world, allowing him to enslave the planet. Freddie and Scotty are thrown into a pool of sea monsters, while Daffers is taken to be brainwashed into a mindless follower and slave of El Supremo and Messina. El Supremo uses the crystal to send his sleeping virus all across Great Britain and the whole country shuts down.

With the help of Freddie's old friend the Loch Ness Monster, Freddie and Scotty save Daffers from the snake guards in disguise. A final battle then ensues between Freddie, Daffers, Scotty, the Loch Ness Monster, El Supremo, Messina, and their army. During the battle, Freddie, Daffers, and Scotty stop El Supremo from conquering the world by shrinking him down to an ant's size. Messina then attacks by shape-shifting consecutively into a bat, hyena, scorpion, and boa constrictor. Freddie tosses Messina into an electrical pole, where she is electrocuted. Brigadier G and his team arrive in time, and Trilby is discovered to be a spy for the villains. Britain is restored to normal and Freddie, Daffers, and Scotty are hailed heroes. After that, the secret service receives a phone call from the United States that Messina, who was secretly alive and well, is starting her plan to take over Washington, D.C. as revenge on Freddie. Hearing the news, Freddie, Daffers, Scotty, and the Loch Ness Monster head off to stop Messina once and for all.

Voice cast 
 Ben Kingsley - Freddie/Prince Frederic, a French prince with magical powers. He is orphaned and turned into a frog by Messina and eventually becomes a member of the French secret service and the British secret service.
 Edmund Kingsley - Young Freddie
 Jenny Agutter - Daffers, a martial arts expert and Freddie's love interest
 Brian Blessed - El Supremo, the main villain responsible for capturing various monuments, which he plans to use to create a sleeping virus. He is also married to Messina, which would make him Freddie's uncle.
 Billie Whitelaw - Messina, Freddie's wicked power-hungry aunt who kills his parents, steals the throne and turns Freddie into a frog. She has the power to shape-shift into any animal, most notably a cobra.
 John Sessions - Scotty, a weapons inventor who befriends Freddie and Daffers / Additional Voices
 Phyllis Logan - Nessie, a Loch Ness monster that Freddie befriends as a frog. She assists him with escaping the sea in the climax of the film.
 Barbara Dickson as Nessie's singing voice.
 Nigel Hawthorne - Brigadier G, the head of the British secret service
 Michael Hordern - King, Freddie's father who is killed by his sister Messina
 Victor Maddern - Old Gentleman Raven
 Jonathan Pryce - Trilby, a sneaky member of the secret service
 Prunella Scales - Queen, Freddie's mother who was killed by Messina one year prior to the events of the film / Additional voices
 Adrian Della Touche (British release) - Narrator
 James Earl Jones (American release) - Narrator

Production 

The film was inspired by bedtime stories Acevski told to his son about his favorite toy frog working as a secret agent.

It was produced from 1989 to 1991.

Release 
Miramax Films purchased the film for distribution in North America. A week after its UK release, the film was released on 28 August 1992 in 1,257 theaters. It was initially set with a G rating by the MPAA, but was later rerated to PG for "some menacing moments". It was also released theatrically in Spain during the 1992 Christmas season. As a result of the disappointing U.S. box office, Miramax did not release the film on home video in the United States.

Alternate versions 
In 1995, MCA/Universal Home Video in conjunction with Shapiro-Glickenhaus Entertainment released the film on home video under an alternate re-edited version, under the title of Freddie the Frog with new narration from actor James Earl Jones. Nearly 20 minutes of footage (including double entendres) was cut and several sequences were re-edited. Racially sensitive elements were removed or changed, like the KKK-members and Nazi axis-like soldiers during the "Evilmainya" song sequence and the tourist and punk crows were re-dubbed, not only was this to make the film more family friendly, but was also an attempt to make the movie less confusing to viewers. This re-edit of the film ended up with a G rating from the MPAA.

Home media 
As of today, the film is still regarded as a highly obscure animated film, which to this day neither the original 1992 theatrical version or the 1995 re-edited version have seen a DVD or Blu-ray release (although rumors persist on copies of the 1995 re-edit are known to exist in some European countries, most notably in Netherlands and Hungary). However, the original version of the film can still be viewed on YouTube.

Reception 
Despite a large publicity campaign and huge media coverage of the film's production, Freddie as F.R.O.7 was both a critical and financial flop. The film received negative reviews in its home country and in North America when it was released there. Renowned animation critic Charles Solomon said, "this 21-gun stinker makes Saturday-morning television look good." He continued by saying "the improbable story is so full of gaps, it's difficult to believe writer-producer-director Jon Acevski ever read his own screenplay." Derek Elley of Variety said, "A shake 'n' bake mixture of virtually every toon genre going, it makes up in energy what it lacks in originality". "The movie, which bills itself as the most ambitious animated film ever to come out of Britain, is a convoluted adventure story that swirls classic fairy-tale mythology together with modern pop-cultural iconography into an unwieldy hodgepodge," said Stephen Holden of The New York Times.

Box office 
The film flopped at the domestic box office as well, grossing little over $1 million. On 21 May 2007, AOL claimed the film is the lowest grossing animated film of all time by counting its US gross ($1,119,368), while as of August 2009, two widely released animated features, The Ten Commandments, which grossed $952,820 in 830 theaters (and also had Ben Kingsley) and Delgo ($694,782 / 2,160 theaters) have grossed less than F.R.O.7.

Cancelled sequel 
When the film was released, a proposed sequel, entitled Freddie Goes to Washington, was already in early production. There is little to no information on what the plot would have been like. However, it is speculated that after the events of the first movie, Freddie and his allies would have traveled to Washington D.C. to finally defeat Messina for good, and Freddie would've changed back into a human. Due to the disastrous critical and financial performance of the film, production was cancelled and the animation studio filed for bankruptcy shortly afterwards. As of 2016, no other information of Washington exists outside of a few pencil tests which still can be seen on a YouTube video uploaded back in 2009; presumably from a former animator involved in the film's production.

References

External links 

 
 
 
 
 Freddie as F.R.O.7 at Toonhound

1992 films
1990s adventure films
1992 animated films
1990s musical films
British adventure films
British musical films
1990s English-language films
Loch Ness Monster in film
Miramax films
Miramax animated films
Animated musical films
Animated films about frogs
Films about size change
British animated fantasy films
British children's animated films
British children's fantasy films
Films set in Monaco
Parody films based on James Bond films
1990s children's animated films
1990s British films